Utah State Route 214 may refer to:

 Utah State Route 214 (1941–1953), a former state highway legislative overlay for US-191 in northeastern Juab County and southwestern Utah County, Utah, United States that ran northerly from SR-1 (US-91) in Mona through Goshen Canyon to SR-26 in Goshen
 Utah State Route 214 (1962–1995), a former state highway in southeastern Utah County, Utah, United States that ran northwesterly within Spanish Fork from SR-105 (a point that is currently the junction of US-6 and SR-198) to I-15

See also
 List of state highways in Utah
 List of highways numbered 214

214